Events in the year 2021 in North Macedonia.

Incumbents
 President: Stevo Pendarovski
 Prime Minister: Zoran Zaev

Events
Ongoing — COVID-19 pandemic in North Macedonia
 8 September - At least 15 patients are killed following a fire at a hospital in Tetovo.
 17-31 October - A local election who defeated Prime Minister Zoran Zaev
 12 December - An election held to elect new prime minister
 2021 North Macedonia census

Deaths

1 January – Zoran Džorlev, violinist (b. 1967).

References

 
North Macedonia
North Macedonia